National Route 452 is a national highway of Japan connecting Yūbari, Hokkaidō and Asahikawa, Hokkaidō in Japan, with a total length of 124.4 km (77.3 mi).

References

National highways in Japan
Roads in Hokkaido